Raizada is an Indian surname and a courtesy title used by the Punjabi Hindu Mohyal Brahmin community, the Gujarati Rajput community and the Kayastha community. Notable people bearing the name include:

 Prem Behari Narain Raizada, calligrapher of The Constitution of India
 Niharica Raizada (born 18 April 1990), Luxembourgish actress and former Miss India UK
 Shilpa Raizada, actress
 Satpal Raizada, politician and member of the Himachal Pradesh Legislative Assembly

References

Indian surnames
Surnames of Indian origin
Punjabi-language surnames
Gujarati-language surnames
Mohyal
Rajput clans of Gujarat
Kayastha